Pterostylis erythroconcha, commonly known as the red shell orchid, is a species of orchid endemic to South Australia. As with similar orchids, the flowering plants differ from those which are not flowering. The non-flowering plants have a rosette of leaves but the flowering plants have a single flower with leaves on the flowering spike. This greenhood has a white and green flower with reddish brown markings and a long, fleshy, curved labellum.

Description
Pterostylis erythroconcha is a terrestrial, perennial, deciduous, herb with an underground tuber and when not flowering, a rosette of between three and ten egg-shaped leaves. The flowers are translucent white with reddish-brown stripes and markings. The dorsal sepal and petals are fused, forming a hood or "galea" over the column. Flowering occurs from April to August.

Taxonomy and naming
Pterostylis erythroconcha was first formally described in 1985 by Mark Clements and David Jones from a specimen collected near Corny Point. The description was published in the fourth edition of Flora of South Australia. The specific epithet (erythroconcha) is derived from the Ancient Greek words erythros meaning "red" and konche meaning "snail".

Distribution and habitat
The red shell orchid grows on calcareous sand and limestone, sometimes forming large colonies, usually near the coast, in mallee. It is found in the south-east of South Australia.

References

erythroconcha
Endemic orchids of Australia
Orchids of South Australia
Plants described in 1986